The  was a class of minesweepers of the Imperial Japanese Navy (IJN), serving during the 1930s and World War II. 6 vessels were built in 1931-36 under the Maru 1 Keikaku. They have two sub classes, this article handles them collectively.

Background
 Improved model of the No.1-class. The IJN tried to a small hull than No.1-class to give a performance the same as No.1-class. And this attempt failed when the vessels were discovered to be top heavy by an investigation of the fleet in the aftermath of the Tomozuru Incident.

Ships in classes

No.13 class
 Project number I3A. 4 vessels were built in 1931-1934. No.15 and No.16 were behind with the completed by the Tomozuru Incident. They had clipper-bow.

No.17 class
 Project number I3B. 2 vessels were built in 1935-1936. Improved model of the No.13-class. About their appearance, bow was changed to double-curvature bow and fitted Kampon geared turbine.

Photo

Footnotes

Bibliography
Ships of the World special issue Vol.45, Escort Vessels of the Imperial Japanese Navy, (Japan), February 1996
The Maru Special, Japanese Naval Vessels No.50, Japanese minesweepers and landing ships,  (Japan), April 1981

World War II mine warfare vessels of Japan
Minesweepers of Japan
Mine warfare vessel classes
Mine warfare vessels of the Imperial Japanese Navy